Kenneth Fenwick Randall (December 14, 1887 – June 14, 1947) was a Canadian professional ice hockey player who played for 20 seasons, including ten seasons in the National Hockey League from 1917 to 1927 for the Toronto Arenas, Toronto St. Patricks, Hamilton Tigers and New York Americans. He was a two-time Stanley Cup Champion.

Playing career
Randall had a long and varied playing career at a time when the professional ice hockey world was changing. He was an accomplished scorer when playing forward, and was a good defencemen which he became exclusively later in his career. He turned professional in the Ontario Professional Hockey League (OPHL), and played in the Maritime Professional Hockey League, the Eastern Ontario Professional Hockey League and the Saskatchewan Professional Hockey League before joining the Toronto Blueshirts of the National Hockey Association (NHA) in 1915. He played for the organization until 1923, as it changed from the Blueshirts to Arenas to St. Patricks, winning two Stanley Cups, in 1918 and 1922. In 1923, he joined the Hamilton Tigers, which in 1924 became embroiled in a labor conflict and his contract was sold to the new New York Americans, for which he played two years before becoming a player coach with the Providence Reds. He became a full-time coach in 1928, but still had some playing time left in him, playing for the Oshawa Patricias when the OPHL was revived in 1930.

Career statistics

Regular season and playoffs

Coaching record

External links

1887 births
1947 deaths
Canadian ice hockey defencemen
Canadian ice hockey right wingers
Hamilton Tigers (ice hockey) players
Ice hockey people from Ontario
Ice hockey player-coaches
Montreal Wanderers (NHA) players
Montreal Wanderers players
New York Americans players
Sportspeople from Kingston, Ontario
Stanley Cup champions
Toronto Arenas players
Toronto Blueshirts players
Toronto St. Pats players